Bollengo is a comune (municipality) in the Metropolitan City of Turin in the Italian region Piedmont, about  northeast of Turin. It borders the municipalities of Torrazzo, Burolo, Ivrea, Palazzo Canavese, Magnano, Albiano d'Ivrea and Azeglio.

References

Cities and towns in Piedmont
Canavese